The Dance () is a 1998 Icelandic drama film produced and directed by Ágúst Guðmundsson. It is set in the Faroe Islands and revolves around a wedding which is 	
interrupted when a British fishing trawler is wrecked nearby. The screenplay is based on the short story Her skal danses by William Heinesen from Faroe Islands. It was filmed in the Faroe Islands with an Icelandic cast. It was entered into the 21st Moscow International Film Festival where Guðmundsson won the Silver St. George for Best Director.

Cast
 Gunnar Helgason as Pétur
 Baldur T. Hreinsson as Ívar (as Baldur Trausti Hreinsson)
 Pálína Jónsdóttir as Sirsa
 Dofri Hermannsson as Haraldur
 Gísli Halldórsson as Nikulás
 Kristina Sundar Hansen as Anna Linda
 Saga Jónsdóttir as Salmóma
 Arnar Jónsson as Djákni
 Magnús Ólafsson as Sýslumaður
 Benedikt Erlingsson as Hólófernes

Production
Kristín Atladóttir and Ágúst Guðmundsson wrote the script after William Heinesen's short story "Her skal danses". Ísfilm produced the film in collaboration with Oxford Film Company, Nordisk Film and Hamburger Kino Kompanie. The film was shot in the Faroe Islands with Icelandic actors.

Release
The film was screened at the 1998 Toronto International Film Festival, Festroia International Film Festival,  the 21st Moscow International Film Festival and several other festivals. It was released in Icelandic cinemas on 23 September 1998.

Critical response
Guðmundur Ásgeirsson of Morgunblaðið described The Dance as "without a doubt one of the better films that have been made in this country" and compared it to the Danish film Babette's Feast. He found the dialogues to be of uneven quality while the fragmented narrative gave a lightness to the film. The critic wrote: "The Dance is the best Icelandic film of the last year and raises hopes of a brighter future for the industry."

Variety's Leonard Klady wrote:
Helmer's graceful, precise style contrasts sharply with the howling winds and fierce rains that pummel the characters. Tech credits are richly hued and amplified by a haunting score that incorporates traditional folk music. The cast is vividly drawn, down to the tiniest part.

Accolades
The film won the prize for Best Cinematography at Festroia and Best Director at the Moscow International Film Festival.

At the 1999 Edda Awards, Þórunn María Jónsdóttir received the prize for Best Costumes. The film was also nominated for Best Film, Director and Actor (Dofri Hermannsson). It was nominated for the Norwegian Amanda Award the same year for Best Nordic Film.

References

External links
 Official website
 
 

1998 films
1998 drama films
Films based on short fiction
Films directed by Ágúst Guðmundsson
Films set in the Faroe Islands
Icelandic drama films
1990s Icelandic-language films